Swallows and Amazons is a 1974 British film adaption of the 1930 novel of the same name by Arthur Ransome. The film, which was directed by Claude Whatham and produced by Richard Pilbrow, starred Virginia McKenna and Ronald Fraser, and a young Zanna Hamilton. Its budget was provided by Nat Cohen of EMI Films who had funded the successful 1970 film The Railway Children.

Plot
During the school holidays, the Walker children (John, Susan, Titty and Roger; the Swallows) are staying at a farm near a lake in the Lake District. They sail a borrowed dinghy named Swallow, and camp on an island in the lake  that they call Wild Cat Island.

They meet two local girls Nancy and Peggy Blackett, who sail a dinghy named Amazon and live in Beckfoot a house up the nearby Amazon River. The Amazons (the Blackett girls; they call themselves "Amazon Pirates" and fly the "Jolly Roger" on their yacht) have been coming to the island for years, and claim the island as their territory. So the scene is set for serious rivalry.

Eventually they make friends and agree to join forces against a common enemy – the Blacketts' Uncle Jim (Jim Turner) whom they call "Captain Flint" (after the character in Treasure Island). Uncle Jim, normally an ally of his nieces, has withdrawn from their company to write his memoirs and has become decidedly unfriendly.

To determine who should be the overall leader in their campaign against Captain Flint, the Blacketts and the Walkers have a contest to see which can capture the others' boat. As part of their strategy the Walkers make a dangerous crossing of the lake by night, and John is later cautioned by his mother for this reckless act. The Walkers nevertheless win the contest – thanks to Titty who seizes the Amazon when the Blacketts come to Wild Cat Island. Eventually there is a mock battle between "Captain Flint" and the children, after which Uncle Jim is tried for his crimes and forced to walk the plank on his own houseboat. They agree at the post-battle feast to be friends forever.

Cast
Virginia McKenna - Mrs. Walker 
Ronald Fraser - Uncle Jim 
Simon West - John Walker 
Suzanna Hamilton - Susan Walker (credited as Zanna Hamilton) 
Sophie Neville - Titty Walker
Stephen Grendon - Roger Walker
Kit Seymour - Nancy Blackett 
Lesley Bennett - Peggy Blackett 
Mike Pratt - Mr. Dixon 
Brenda Bruce - Mrs. Dixon 
John Franklyn-Robbins - Young Billy 
Jack Woolgar - Old Billy
David Blagden - Policeman

Production
The film was shot on location in the Lake District National Park in Cumbria during the summer of 1973. Actual locations were used to recreate the fictional lake in Arthur Ransome's novel. In April 2010, the dinghy named Swallow'' in the film was bought by a group of enthusiasts who restored her to sailing condition.

Release
EMI distributed the film in the UK in 1974.

Home media
The film has been made available on video, both in VHS and DVD, in the UK, but is not readily available in the USA and elsewhere.

External links

References

Film
1974 films
Films based on British novels
British children's films
Films set in the Lake District
1970s children's films
EMI Films films
1970s children's adventure films
Films shot at EMI-Elstree Studios
1970s English-language films
Films directed by Claude Whatham
1970s British films